Bishops Wood, or Bishopswood is a small village on the Staffordshire border with Shropshire. It is home to the Royal Oak public house, the first to be named after the nearby oak tree at Boscobel House in which King Charles II hid after the Battle of Worcester. The population for this village taken at the 2011 census can be found under Brewood and Coven. Bishop's Wood is a 352 hectare wood 4 miles west north west of Eccleshall, Staffordshire.

The village, in the parish of Brewood, may derive its name from the country residence of the early Bishops of Lichfield: Boscobel House. The King Charles II Royal Oak tree, White Ladies Priory, Blackladies (another former priory, now a private residence) and Weston Park are all within easy walking distance.

See also
Listed buildings in Brewood and Coven

External links

 Brewood Parish

Villages in Staffordshire